Public service law in the United States is the body of law, primarily based on a multitude of statutes, which establishes and organizes the delivery of public services in the United States.

History
Second Bill of Rights
Regulation
Nationalization
Privatization
History of US antitrust law

Administrative law

Judicial review

Education

 1965: Elementary and Secondary Education Act (ESEA)
 1965: Higher Education Act of 1965 (HEA) (Pub. L. No. 89-329)
 1974: Family Educational Rights and Privacy Act (FERPA)
 1974: Equal Educational Opportunities Act of 1974 (EEOA)
 1975: Education for All Handicapped Children Act (EHA) (Pub. L. No. 94-142)
 1978: Protection of Pupil Rights Amendment
 1980: Department of Education Organization Act (Pub. L. No. 96-88)
 1984: Equal Access Act
 1990: The Jeanne Clery Disclosure of Campus Security Policy and Campus Crime Statistics Act (Clery Act)
 1994: Improving America's Schools Act of 1994
 2001: No Child Left Behind Act (NCLB)
 2004: Individuals with Disabilities Education Act (IDEA)
 2005: Higher Education Reconciliation Act of 2005 (HERA) (Pub. L. No. 109-171)
 2006: Carl D. Perkins Career and Technical Education Improvement Act
 2007: America COMPETES Act
 2008: Higher Education Opportunity Act (HEOA) (Pub. L. No. 110-315)
 2009: Race to the Top
 2009: Student Aid and Fiscal Responsibility Act
 2010: Health Care and Education Reconciliation Act of 2010
:Category:United States education case law

Health

Department of Health
 1946: Hospital Survey and Construction Act (Hill-Burton Act) PL 79-725
 1949: Hospital Construction Act PL 81-380
 1950: Public Health Services Act Amendments PL 81-692
 1955: Poliomyelitis Vaccination Assistance Act PL 84-377
 1956: Health Research Facilities Act PL 84-835
 1960: Social Security Amendments (Kerr-Mill aid) PL 86-778
 1961: Community Health Services and Facilities Act PL 87-395
 1962: Public Health Service Act PL 87-838
 1962: Vaccination Assistance PL 87-868
 1963: Mental Retardation Facilities Construction Act/Community Mental Health Centers Act PL 88-164
 1964: Nurse Training Act PL 88-581
 1965: Community Health Services and Facilities Act PL 89-109
 1965: Medicare PL 89-97
 1965: Mental Health Centers Act Amendments PL 89-105
 1965: Heart Disease, Cancer, and Stroke Amendments PL 89-239
 1966: Comprehensive Health Planning and Service Act PL 89-749
 1970: Community Mental Health Service Act PL 91-211
 1970: Family Planning Services and Population Research Act PL 91-572
 1970: Lead-Based Paint Poisoning Prevention Act PL 91-695
 1971: National Cancer Act PL 92-218
 1974: Research on Aging Act PL 93-296
 1974: National Health Planning and Resources Development Act PL 93-641
 1979: Department of Education Organization Act (removed education functions) PL 96-88
 1987: Department of Transportation Appropriations Act PL 100-202
 1988: Medicare Catastrophic Coverage Act PL 100-360
 1989: Department of Transportation and Related Agencies Appropriations Act PL 101-164
 1996: Health Insurance Portability and Accountability Act PL 104-191
 2000: Child Abuse Reform and Enforcement Act P.L. 106-177
 2010: Patient Protection and Affordable Care Act PL 111-148

Housing

 1944 – Servicemen's Readjustment Act, 
 1949 – Housing Act, 
 1950 – Housing Act, 
 1951 – Defense Housing Act, 
 1952 – 550 Veterans Readjustment Assistance Act, 
 1954 – Housing Act, 
 1959 – Housing Act, 
 1962 – Senior Citizens Housing Act, 
 1965 – Housing and Urban Development Act, 
 1965 – Department of Housing and Urban Development Act, 
 1968 – Housing and Urban Development Act, 
 1974 – Housing and Urban Development Act, 
 1976 – Housing and Urban Development Act, 
 1986 – Tax Reform Act of 1986, 
 Low-Income Housing Tax Credit
 1987 – Housing and Community Development Act of 1987, 
 1987 – Stewart B. McKinney Homeless Assistance Act, 
 1989 – Department of Housing and Urban Development Reform Act of 1989, 
 1990 – Cranston-Gonzalez National Affordable Housing Act, 
 1992 – Housing and Community Development Act of 1992, 
 Federal Housing Enterprises Financial Safety and Soundness Act of 1992, 
 2009 – American Recovery and Reinvestment Act of 2009, abbreviated ARRA, 
 Repairing and modernizing public housing, including increasing the energy efficiency of units, $4 billion to the Department of Housing and Urban Development (HUD)

Utilities
Public Utility Holding Company Act of 1935

Energy

 1920 – Federal Power Act
 1946 – Atomic Energy Act PL 79-585 (created the Atomic Energy Commission)
 1954 – Atomic Energy Act Amendments PL 83-703
 1956 – Colorado River Storage Project PL 84-485
 1957 – Atomic Energy Commission Acquisition of Property PL 85-162
 1957 – Price-Anderson Nuclear Industries Indemnity Act PL 85-256
 1968 – Natural Gas Pipeline Safety Act PL 90-481
 1973 – Mineral Leasing Act Amendments (Trans-Alaska Oil Pipeline Authorization) PL 93-153
 1974 – Energy Reorganization Act PL 93-438 (Split the AEC into the Energy Research and Development Administration and the Nuclear Regulatory Commission)
 1975 – Energy Policy and Conservation Act PL 94-163
 1977 – Department of Energy Organization Act PL 95-91 (Dismantled ERDA and replaced it with the Department of Energy)
 1978 – National Energy Act PL 95-617, 618, 619, 620, 621
 1980 – Energy Security Act PL 96-294
 1989 – Natural Gas Wellhead Decontrol Act PL 101-60
 1992 – Energy Policy Act of 1992 PL 102-486
 2000 – National Nuclear Security Administration Act PL 106-65
 2005 – Energy Policy Act of 2005 PL 109-58
 2007 – Energy Independence and Security Act of 2007 PL 110-140
 2008 – Food, Conservation, and Energy Act of 2008 PL 110-234
Arizona Public Service Co. v. Snead
Baltimore Gas & Elec. Co. v. Natural Resources Defense Council, Inc.
Central Hudson Gas & Electric Corp. v. Public Service Commission
Duke Power Co. v. Carolina Environmental Study Group
Entergy Louisiana, Inc. v. Louisiana Public Service Commission
Exxon Corp. v. Governor of Maryland
Federal Power Commission v. Sierra Pacific Power Company
Federal Power Commission v. Tuscarora Indian Nation
Jackson v. Metropolitan Edison Co.
Metropolitan Edison Co. v. People Against Nuclear Energy
North American Co. v. Securities and Exchange Commission
Pacific Gas & Electric Co. v. State Energy Resources Conservation and Development Commission
Pacific Gas & Electric v. Public Utilities Commission
Panama Refining Co. v. Ryan
Phillips Petroleum Co. v. Wisconsin
Standard Oil Company of New Jersey v. United States
State Oil Company v. Khan
National Audubon Society v. Superior Court
Tennessee Valley Authority v. Hill
Texaco Inc. v. Dagher
United Gas Pipe Line Co. v. Ideal Cement Co.
United Gas Pipe Line Co. v. Memphis Light, Gas, and Water Division
United Gas Pipe Line Co. v. Mobile Gas Service Corp.
Vermont Yankee Nuclear Power Corp. v. Natural Resources Defense Council, Inc.

Water

Slaughter-House Cases,

Transport

Department of Transport
1806 – Cumberland Road
1862 – Pacific Railway Act
1887 – Interstate Commerce Act
1916 – Adamson Railway Labor Act
1935 – Motor Carrier Act
1946 – Federal Airport Act PL 79-377
1950 – Federal Aid to Highway PL 81-769
1954 – Saint Lawrence Seaway Act
1956 – Federal-Aid to Highway/Interstate Highway Act PL 84-627
1957 – Airways Modernization Act PL 85-133
1958 – Transportation Act PL 85-625
1958 – Federal Aviation Act PL 85-726
1959 – Airport Construction Act PL 86-72
1964 – Urban Mass Transportation Act PL 88-365
1965 – Highway Beautification Act PL 89-285
1966 – Department of Transportation established PL 89-670
1970 – Urban Mass Transportation Act PL 91-453
1970 – Rail Passenger Service Act PL 91-518
1970 – Airport and Airway Development Act PL 91-258
1973 – Federal Aid Highway Act PL 93-87
1973 – Amtrak Improvement Act PL 93-146
1973 – Federal Aid Highway Act PL 93-87
1974 – National Mass Transportation Assistance Act PL 93-503
1976 – Railroad Revitalization and Regulatory Reform Act PL 94-210
1976 – Hart-Scott-Rodino Antitrust Improvements Act PL 94-435
1978 – Airline Deregulation Act PL 95-504
1980 – Motor Carrier Act PL 96-296
1980 – Staggers Rail Act PL 96-448
1982 – Transportation Assistance Act PL 97-424
1982 – Bus Regulatory Reform Act PL 97-261
1987 – Surface Transportation Act PL 100-17
1991 – Intermodal Surface Transportation Efficiency Act PL 102-240
1998 – Transportation Equity Act for the 21st Century PL 105-178
2000 – Wendell H. Ford Aviation Investment and Reform Act for the 21st Century PL 106-181
2002 – Homeland Security Act (PL 107-296)
2005 – Safe, Accountable, Flexible, Efficient Transportation Equity Act: A Legacy for Users (PL 109-59)

Communications

Telecomms
Communications Act of 1934
Telecommunications Act of 1996
COPE Act of 2006 (Communications Act of 2006)
Telecommunications Act of 2005
Comcast Corp. v. FCC
Federal Communications Commission v. Fox Television Stations (2009)
Federal Communications Commission v. Fox Television Stations (2012)
Federal Communications Commission v. Pacifica Foundation
Hush-A-Phone v. United States
National Broadcasting Co. v. United States
National Cable & Telecommunications Association v. Brand X Internet Services
Red Lion Broadcasting Co. v. Federal Communications Commission
SBC Communications, Inc. v. FCC
Schurz Communications, Incorporated v. Federal Communications Commission and United States of America
Smith v. Maryland
Turner Broadcasting v. Federal Communications Commission
United States v. Southwestern Cable Co.
USTA v. FCC
Verizon Communications Inc. v. FCC (2002)
Verizon Communications Inc. v. FCC (2014)
Verizon Communications v. Law Offices of Curtis V. Trinko, LLP

Media
Federal Radio Commission
Media cross-ownership in the United States

Agriculture and environment
 1890, 1891, 1897, 1906 Meat Inspection Act
 1906: Pure Food and Drug Act
 1914: Cotton Futures Act
 1916: Federal Farm Loan Act
 1917: Food Control and Production Acts
 1921: Packers and Stockyards Act
 1922: Grain Futures Act
 1922: National Agricultural Conference
 1923: Agricultural Credits Act
 1930: Perishable Agricultural Commodities Act
 1930: Foreign Agricultural Service Act
 1933: Agricultural Adjustment Act (AAA)
 1933: Farm Credit Act
 1935: Resettlement Administration
 1936: Soil Conservation and Domestic Allotment Act
 1937: Agricultural Marketing Agreement Act
 1941: National Victory Garden Program
 1941: Steagall Amendment
 1946: Farmers Home Administration
 1946: National School Lunch Act PL 79-396
 1946: Research and Marketing Act
 1948: Hope-Aiken Agriculture Act PL 80-897
 1956: Soil Bank Program authorized
 1957: Poultry Inspection Act
 1947: Federal Insecticide, Fungicide, and Rodenticide Act PL 80-104
 1949: Agricultural Act PL 81-439 (Section 416 (b))
 1954: Food for Peace Act PL 83-480
 1954: Agricultural Act PL 83-690
 1956: Mutual Security Act PL 84-726
 1957: Poultry Products Inspection Act PL 85-172
 1958: Food Additives Amendment PL 85-929
 1958: Humane Slaughter Act
 1958: Agricultural Act PL 85-835
 1961: Agricultural Act PL 87-128
 1964: Agricultural Act PL 88-297
 1964: Food Stamp Act PL 88-525
 1964: Federal Insecticide, Fungicide, and Rodenticide Act Extension PL 88-305
 1965: Appalachian Regional Development Act
 1965: Food and Agriculture Act PL 89-321
 1966: Child Nutrition Act PL 89-642
 1967: Wholesome Meat Act PL 90-201
 1968: Wholesome Poultry Products Act PL 90-492
 1970: Agricultural Act PL 91-524
 1972: Federal Environmental Pesticide Control Act PL 92-516
 1970: Environmental Quality Improvement Act
 1970: Food Stamp Act PL 91-671
 1972: Rural Development Act
 1972: Rural Development Act Reform 3.31
 1972: National School Lunch Act Amendments (Special Supplemental Nutrition Program for Women, Infants and Children) PL 92-433
 1973: Agriculture and Consumer Protection Act PL 93-86
 1974: Safe Drinking Water Act PL 93-523
 1977: Food and Agriculture Act PL 95-113
 1985: Food Security Act PL 99-198
 1996: Federal Agriculture Improvement and Reform Act PL 104-127
 1996: Food Quality Protection Act PL 104-170
 2000: Agriculture Risk Protection Act PL 106-224
 2002: Farm Security and Rural Investment Act PL 107-171
 2008: Food, Conservation, and Energy Act of 2008 PL 110-246
 2010: Healthy, Hunger-Free Kids Act of 2010 PL 111-296

Taxation

See also
Public service law in the United Kingdom
US antitrust law
European Union competition law
Economics of the public sector
Universal service fund
Universal service

Public services
United States administrative law
United States public law